Kulautuva is a town in Kaunas district municipality, in Kaunas County, in central Lithuania. It is situated on the right bank of the Nemunas River. According to the 2011 census, the village has a population of 1,425 people.

References

Towns in Lithuania
Towns in Kaunas County